Pit Pony is a 1997 television film directed by Eric Till and is also Elliot Page's debut role. It was nominated for numerous Gemini Awards in 1997.

Cast
Ben Rose-Davis as Willie MacLean
Richard Donat as Rory MacLean
Jennie Raymond as Nellie MacLean
Andrew Keilty as John MacLean
Elliot Page as Maggie MacLean

Awards and nominations

Gemini Awards

Explanatory Notes

References

External links

1997 films
1997 drama films
Canadian drama television films
English-language Canadian films
Films about families
Films about horses
Films based on Canadian novels
Films directed by Eric Till
Films set in 1901
Films set in Nova Scotia
Films shot in Nova Scotia
Films about mining
1990s English-language films
1990s Canadian films